Brigadier-General Wilfred Ellershaw (1871 – 5 June 1916) was a British Army officer who served as Aide-de-Camp to Lord Kitchener.

Ellershaw was the son of Reverend John Ellershaw. He was educated at Bloxham School in Oxfordshire. He married Katherine Ingles, daughter of Rear-Admiral John Ingles and Catherine Sophia Glennie, on 22 June 1899.

He was commissioned into the Royal Artillery. Between 1899 and 1906 he was an instructor at the Royal Military Academy, Sandhurst. He subsequently rose to the rank of brigadier-general. During the First World War he served as Special Service Officer at the War Office and became the Aide-de-Camp to the British Filed Marshall, Lord Kitchener.

Ellershaw died alongside Kitchener on 5 June 1916 when the ship he was on, HMS Hampshire, struck a mine laid by a German U-boat shortly after leaving Scapa Flow.

Ellershaw is commemorated on the Hollybrook Memorial of Hollybrook Cemetery, located in Shirley, Southampton.

References

1871 births
1916 deaths
19th-century British Army personnel
People educated at Bloxham School
British Army brigadiers
Royal Artillery officers
British Army personnel of World War I
British military personnel killed in World War I
Burials at Hollybrook Cemetery
Deaths due to shipwreck at sea
Academics of the Royal Military College, Sandhurst